Sila (lit: Result), was a Pakistani drama serial, that aired on 28 October 2016, preceded by Dharkan. It stars Shakeel, Farhan Saeed, Ainy Jaffri, Ismat Zaidi in leading to pivot roles. It aired on Fridays at 9:10pm PST.

Ainy Jaffri makes her return to Hum TV after she was last seen in channel's hit serial, Aseerzadi. Farhan Saeed was last seen in hit serial Udaari. Eshita was last seen in channel's Zindagi Tujh Ko Jiya.

Cast 
 Farhan Saeed as Taimoor
 Ainy Jaffri as Mariam
 Eshita as Mishal 
 Shakeel as Aleem  
 Ismat Zaidi as Razia 
 Javed Sheikh as Ehsaan 
 Farah Shah as Nargis 
 Madiha Zaidi as Mehwish 
 Hina Javed as Mehwish
 Haya Sehgal as Farkhanda 
 Arjumand Azhar as Jahangir
 Tehmina Siddiqui as Sana 
 Shamim Hilaly as Sajjad's mother

Plot 
Mariam belongs to a middle-class family. Her father is a retired banker and her mother teaches in a school. Mariam gets a scholarship to medical college where she falls in loves with Taimoor, the son of a surgeon. Taimoor’s mother wants him to marry her niece, but the duo gets married against her wishes and starts a new life in a middle-class neighbourhood. What does life have in store for them? Maryam meets her professor and starts a job with him. Taimoor dislikes this as he thinks that it is his job to earn bread and butter. Here Taimoors father and Niece Mishal trick him to think that Maryam is having affair with her boss and saw them coming out of a five-star hotel kissing when Maryam said her father had a heart attack. Taimoor goes into depression and smokes. He slaps Maryam and then apologises but this causes a breakage in the love of the duo. Maryam goes to her father's house and finds that she is five months pregnant. She stays the night and Taimoor thinks that she is lying and gets angry. He shifts back to his dads house and agrees to marry Mishal. Maryam goes to his office and tells him she is pregnant, but he says that he will be divorcing her soon and this child is Sajjad's. Maryam slaps him and leaves. Taimoor gets a call for a concert and opens his email where he realises Maryam was right. He refuses to marry Mishal and tells Maryam to come to this concert where she forgives him after putting her hand on her womb after Taimor asks forgiveness for the sake of his child.

Production

Filming 
It was heard that this drama was shot in 2013 but it would air in 2016 starring Farhan Saeed and Ainy Jaffri. The whole shooting is done in United Medical and Dental College UMDC, a medical college in Karachi.

Casting
Initially Fahad Mustafa was selected to play the titular character but then he rejected due to movies. So the drama was reshot with Farhan Saeed as main lead.

MD Productions chose cast Ainy Jaffri as Mariam, Farhan Saeed as Taimoor, Javed Sheikh as Ahsan, Farah Shah as Nargis, Haya Sehgal as elder sister of Marium, Farkhanda and Tehmina Siddiqui as her younger sister, Sana. Shakeel and Ismat Zaidi play role of Mariam and her siblings' parents. While, Eshita Syed was chosen to play character of Mishal, who is chosen by Taimoor's parents for his marriage. Arjumand Azhar (Hussain) was chosen for the role of Jahangir (Mishal's father) and "Uncredited" to portray role of Nargis' sister and Mishal's mother role. Meanwhile, Shakeel and Ismat Zaidi are playing role of Mariyam and her siblings' parents.
The drama has already been a hit. Both the leads had immediate successes following the drama as Farhan Saeed gained a lot of fans and released new awesome songs and Ainy Jaffri made her awesome movie debut in the movie Balu Mahi.

See also 
 List of programs broadcast by Hum TV
 2016 in Pakistani television

References

External links 
 Hum TV Website
 

Pakistani drama television series
2016 Pakistani television series debuts
2017 Pakistani television series endings
Urdu-language television shows
Hum TV original programming